Cécile Sophie Pieper (born 31 August 1994) is a German field hockey player. She represented her country at the 2016 Summer Olympics.

, Pieper was studying for a master's degree at the University of Connecticut, where she played on the Connecticut Huskies field hockey team.

References

External links
 
 
 
 
 

1994 births
Living people
German female field hockey players
Olympic field hockey players of Germany
Olympic medalists in field hockey
Olympic bronze medalists for Germany
Field hockey players at the 2016 Summer Olympics
Field hockey players at the 2020 Summer Olympics
Medalists at the 2016 Summer Olympics
Sportspeople from Heidelberg
Female field hockey midfielders
UConn Huskies field hockey players
Mannheimer HC players
HGC players
21st-century German women

2018 FIH Indoor Hockey World Cup players